Topoľové hony is a nature reserve in the Podunajské Biskupice district of Bratislava, Slovakia. The nature reserve covers an area of 60.06 ha on the left shore of the Danube. It has a protection level of 5 under the Slovak nature protection system. The nature reserve is part of the Dunajské luhy Protected Landscape Area.

Description
The area was put under protection as a measure to preserve xerophilous pannonic oak forests and plant communities including Staphylea pinnata.

References

Geography of Bratislava Region
Protected areas of Slovakia